Ashtajin (also Romanized as Āshtajīn, Ashtāchīn, Ashtagin, and Ashtajīn; also known as Ashtākīn) is a village in Qaqazan-e Sharqi Rural District, in the Central District of Takestan County, Qazvin Province, Iran. At the 2006 census, its population was 456, in 101 families.

References 

Populated places in Takestan County